Clerodendrum is a genus of flowering plants formerly placed in the family Verbenaceae, but now considered to belong to the Lamiaceae (mint) family. Its common names include glorybower, bagflower and bleeding-heart. It is currently classified in the subfamily Ajugoideae, being one of several genera transferred from Verbenaceae to Lamiaceae in the 1990s, based on phylogenetic analysis of morphological and molecular data.

Estimates of the number of species in Clerodendrum vary widely, from about 150 to about 450. This is partly because about 30 species have been transferred to Rotheca, about 30 more to Volkameria, and 1 to Ovieda. The type species for the genus is Clerodendrum infortunatum. It is native to Sri Lanka and the Andaman Islands.

The genus is native to tropical and warm temperate regions of the world, with most of the species occurring in tropical Africa and southern Asia, but with a few in the tropical Americas and northern Australasia, and a few extending north into the temperate zone in eastern Asia.

Clerodendrum fistulosum and Clerodendrum myrmecophila have hollow stems that are inhabited by ants. Clerodendrum trichotomum is a common ornamental in warmer parts of the world. Eight other species are also grown in the tropics for their abundant and attractive flowers. One of these, Clerodendrum macrostegium, suckers abundantly from the roots, often producing a thicket within a few years.

The following species are cultivated in the UK:
C. chinense
C. splendens
C. thomsoniae
C. trichotomum

Clerodendrum species are used as food plants by the larvae of some Lepidoptera species including Endoclita malabaricus and Endoclita sericeus.  Both butterflies and hummingbirds are often attracted to blooming clerodendrum.

Description 

The following description is based on the one by Yuan et alii (2010) and applies to only the monophyletic circumscription of Clerodendrum.

Clerodendrum is a genus of small trees, shrubs, lianas, and subherbaceous perennials. Leaves decussate or whorled, never spiny as in some close relatives.

Inflorescence usually terminal. Sepals usually connate, often colored, usually accrescent. Corolla red to yellow, pink, or white. Corolla tube 5-lobed, the lobes usually unequal.

Stamens 4 (rarely 5), usually in 2 pairs of unequal length and projecting well beyond the mouth of the corolla.

Ovary incompletely 4-locular. Ovules 4. Style terminal on the ovary, bifid.

Fruit a drupe, usually with 4 grooves or lobes, 4-seeded (rarely 2-seeded by abortion).

Pollination 
Clerodendrum and its relatives have an unusual pollination syndrome which avoids self-pollination. This mating system combines dichogamy and herkogamy.

The flowers are protandrous. When the flower opens, the stamens stand erect, parallel to the central axis of the flower, while the style bends over, holding the stigma beyond the rim of the corolla. After the pollen is shed, the stamens curl up or bend over, and the style straightens out, bringing the stigma to the center of the flower. Except for Aegiphila, which is heterostylous, this breeding strategy is shared by all members of the clade consisting of Kalaharia, Clerodendrum, Volkameria, Aegiphila, Ovieda, Tetraclea, and Amasonia.

History 
Clerodendrum was named by Linnaeus in Species Plantarum in 1753. The name is derived from two Greek words, kleros, meaning "chance or fate" or "clergy", and dendron, "a tree". It refers to the considerable variation in reports of the usefulness of Clerodendrum in medicine, and also to the fact the trees were used for religious purposes in Asia.

Regional revisions of Clerodendrum have been done for local floras, but the last monograph of the entire genus was by John Isaac Briquet in 1895. He recognized about 90 species, defining the genus broadly to include species that others had placed in Rotheca, Volkameria, and Ovieda. His circumscription was followed by most authors for the next 100 years, even though it was widely believed to be problematic.

In 1997, phylogenetic analysis of DNA data showed that Clerodendrum, as then understood, was polyphyletic. This situation was remedied in 1998 with the revival of Rotheca. This taxonomic change was based on previous work and on a molecular phylogenetic study that was not published until the following year.

In 2004, a study of DNA sequences showed that the monospecific Australian genus Huxleya was embedded in a clade of Clerodendrum species that had formerly been placed in Volkameria. Huxleya was then sunk into synonymy with Clerodendrum. The 2004 study sampled Aegiphila, Tetraclea, and Amasonia, three New World genera of Ajugoideae that had not previously been sampled for DNA. The results of this study cast doubt, once again, upon the monophyly of Clerodendrum.

In 2010, a study of four chloroplast DNA intergenic spacers showed that part of Clerodendrum was closer to the New world genera than to other Clerodendrum, and that one species of Clerodendrum was nested within the clade of New World genera. The authors of this study resurrected the genus Volkameria and assigned to it about 30 species that had been in Clerodendrum. They also resurrected Ovieda as a monotypic genus consisting of  Ovieda spinosa. Volkameria and Ovieda had been erected by Linnaeus in 1753. Modern cladistic analysis has largely vindicated his concepts of Clerodendrum and its relatives.

Traditional medicinal use
Clerodendrum glandulosum. Coleb leaf aqueous extract is traditionally used by people of North-East India to alleviate symptoms of diabetes, obesity and hypertension.

Among the Hmar and Zomi tribes in the North East India Anphui(Clerodendrum) is also being used as a dish/curry.

Systematics 
Clerodendrum is strongly supported as monophyletic in molecular phylogenetic analyses. It consists of two clades, each of which receives strong bootstrap support. One clade contains mostly African species. The other is mostly Asian. The African and Asian groups can not confidently be divided into sections without more extensive sampling of taxa in phylogenetic studies. The Madagascan species, in particular, are poorly studied.

It appears that the long, narrow corolla tube evolved only once in Clerodendrum, and appeared again, among its relatives, in Ovieda.

Species 
 Plants of the World Online recognises 258 species within this genus, as follows.

 Clerodendrum abilioi 
 Clerodendrum adenocalyx 
 Clerodendrum adenophysum 
 Clerodendrum africanum 
 Clerodendrum albiflos 
 Clerodendrum alboviolaceum 
 Clerodendrum andamanense 
 Clerodendrum anomalum 
 Clerodendrum apayaoense 
 Clerodendrum arenarium 
 Clerodendrum atlanticum 
 Clerodendrum aucubifolium 
 Clerodendrum barba-felis 
 Clerodendrum baronianum 
 Clerodendrum baumii 
 Clerodendrum bellum 
 Clerodendrum bingaense 
 Clerodendrum bipindense 
 Clerodendrum boivinii 
 Clerodendrum bosseri 
 Clerodendrum brachyanthum 
 Clerodendrum brachystemon 
 Clerodendrum bracteatum 
 Clerodendrum brassii 
 Clerodendrum brunfelsiiflorum 
 Clerodendrum brunnescens 
 Clerodendrum brunsvigioides 
 Clerodendrum buchananii 
 Clerodendrum buchneri 
 Clerodendrum buettneri 
 Clerodendrum bungei 
 Clerodendrum calamitosum 
 Clerodendrum canescens 
 Clerodendrum capitatum 
 Clerodendrum carnosulum 
 Clerodendrum caryopteroides 
 Clerodendrum cauliflorum 
 Clerodendrum cecil-fischeri 
 Clerodendrum cephalanthum 
 Clerodendrum chamaeriphes 
 Clerodendrum chartaceum 
 Clerodendrum chinense 
 Clerodendrum chlorisepalum 
 Clerodendrum cochinchinense 
 Clerodendrum colebrookeanum 
 Clerodendrum comans 
 Clerodendrum confine 
 Clerodendrum corbisieri 
 Clerodendrum costatum 
 Clerodendrum cuspidatum 
 Clerodendrum cyrtophyllum 
 Clerodendrum dauphinense 
 Clerodendrum decaryi 
 Clerodendrum deflexum 
 Clerodendrum dembianense 
 Clerodendrum densiflorum 
 Clerodendrum denticulatum 
 Clerodendrum dependens 
 Clerodendrum dewittei 
 Clerodendrum dinklagei 
 Clerodendrum disparifolium 
 Clerodendrum dusenii 
 Clerodendrum ekmanii 
 Clerodendrum elbertii 
 Clerodendrum elliotii 
 Clerodendrum emirnense 
 Clerodendrum erectum 
 Clerodendrum ervatamioides 
 Clerodendrum eucalycinum 
 Clerodendrum eupatorioides 
 Clerodendrum excavatum 
 Clerodendrum farafanganense 
 Clerodendrum fasciculatum 
 Clerodendrum filipes 
 Clerodendrum finetii 
 Clerodendrum fistulosum 
 Clerodendrum floribundum 
 Clerodendrum formicarum 
 Clerodendrum fortunatum 
 Clerodendrum frutectorum 
 Clerodendrum fugitans 
 Clerodendrum fuscum 
 Clerodendrum galeatum 
 Clerodendrum garrettianum 
 Clerodendrum gaudichaudii 
 Clerodendrum geoffrayi 
 Clerodendrum gibbosum 
 Clerodendrum giganteum 
 Clerodendrum globosum 
 Clerodendrum globuliflorum 
 Clerodendrum godefroyi 
 Clerodendrum grayi 
 Clerodendrum grevei 
 Clerodendrum griffithianum 
 Clerodendrum haematolasium 
 Clerodendrum hahnianum 
 Clerodendrum hainanense 
 Clerodendrum harmandianum 
 Clerodendrum hastatum 
 Clerodendrum hendersonii 
 Clerodendrum hettae 
 Clerodendrum hexangulatum 
 Clerodendrum hildebrandtii 
 Clerodendrum hircinum 
 Clerodendrum hiulcum 
 Clerodendrum humbertii 
 Clerodendrum inaequipetiolatum 
 Clerodendrum indicum 
 Clerodendrum infortunatum 
 Clerodendrum insolitum 
 Clerodendrum intermedium 
 Clerodendrum involucratum 
 Clerodendrum izuinsulare 
 Clerodendrum japonicum 
 Clerodendrum johnstonii 
 Clerodendrum johorense 
 Clerodendrum kaichianum 
 Clerodendrum kamhyoae 
 Clerodendrum kampotense 
 Clerodendrum kanichi 
 Clerodendrum katangensis 
 Clerodendrum kauderni 
 Clerodendrum kiangsiense 
 Clerodendrum kinabaluense 
 Clerodendrum klemmei 
 Clerodendrum kwangtungense 
 Clerodendrum laciniatum 
 Clerodendrum laevifolium 
 Clerodendrum lanceoliferum 
 Clerodendrum lanessanii 
 Clerodendrum lankawiense 
 Clerodendrum lanuginosum 
 Clerodendrum lastellei 
 Clerodendrum laxiflorum 
 Clerodendrum lecomtei 
 Clerodendrum leucobotrys 
 Clerodendrum leucophloeum 
 Clerodendrum lindenianum 
 Clerodendrum lindleyi 
 Clerodendrum lloydianum 
 Clerodendrum longiflorum 
 Clerodendrum longisepalum 
 Clerodendrum lutambense 
 Clerodendrum luteopunctatum 
 Clerodendrum macrocalycinum 
 Clerodendrum macrostegium 
 Clerodendrum madagascariense 
 Clerodendrum magnificum 
 Clerodendrum magnoliifolium 
 Clerodendrum mananjariense 
 Clerodendrum mandarinorum 
 Clerodendrum mandrarense 
 Clerodendrum mannii 
 Clerodendrum manombense 
 Clerodendrum margaritense 
 Clerodendrum melanocrater 
 Clerodendrum micans 
 Clerodendrum mildbraedii 
 Clerodendrum minahassae 
 Clerodendrum mindorense 
 Clerodendrum moramangense 
 Clerodendrum morigono 
 Clerodendrum multibracteatum 
 Clerodendrum myrianthum 
 Clerodendrum myrmecophilum 
 Clerodendrum myrtifolium 
 Clerodendrum nhatrangense 
 Clerodendrum nicolsonii 
 Clerodendrum nipense 
 Clerodendrum nutans 
 Clerodendrum ohwii 
 Clerodendrum palmatolobatum 
 Clerodendrum paniculatum 
 Clerodendrum parvitubulatum 
 Clerodendrum parvulum 
 Clerodendrum paucidentatum 
 Clerodendrum pauciflorum 
 Clerodendrum peii 
 Clerodendrum peregrinum 
 Clerodendrum perrieri 
 Clerodendrum petasites 
 Clerodendrum petunioides 
 Clerodendrum phlomidis 
 Clerodendrum phyllomega 
 Clerodendrum pierreanum 
 Clerodendrum pleiosciadium 
 Clerodendrum poggei 
 Clerodendrum polyanthum 
 Clerodendrum polycephalum 
 Clerodendrum porphyrocalyx 
 Clerodendrum praetervisa 
 Clerodendrum premnoides 
 Clerodendrum preslii 
 Clerodendrum pubiflorum 
 Clerodendrum pusillum 
 Clerodendrum putre 
 Clerodendrum pygmaeum 
 Clerodendrum pynaertii 
 Clerodendrum pyrifolium 
 Clerodendrum quadriloculare 
 Clerodendrum ramosissimum 
 Clerodendrum revolutum 
 Clerodendrum ridleyi 
 Clerodendrum ringoetii 
 Clerodendrum robecchii 
 Clerodendrum robustum 
 Clerodendrum roseiflorum 
 Clerodendrum rotundifolium 
 Clerodendrum rubellum 
 Clerodendrum rumphianum 
 Clerodendrum rusbyi 
 Clerodendrum sakaleonense 
 Clerodendrum sarawakanum 
 Clerodendrum sassandrense 
 Clerodendrum sayapense 
 Clerodendrum schmidtii 
 Clerodendrum schweinfurthii 
 Clerodendrum sessilifolium 
 Clerodendrum silvanum 
 Clerodendrum silvestre 
 Clerodendrum singwanum 
 Clerodendrum sinuatum 
 Clerodendrum smitinandii 
 Clerodendrum speciosissimum 
 Clerodendrum splendens 
 Clerodendrum subpeltatum 
 Clerodendrum subreniforme 
 Clerodendrum subtruncatum 
 Clerodendrum sylvae 
 Clerodendrum sylvestre 
 Clerodendrum tanganyikense 
 Clerodendrum tatei 
 Clerodendrum ternatum 
 Clerodendrum thomsoniae 
 Clerodendrum thouarsii 
 Clerodendrum thyrsoideum 
 Clerodendrum tibetanum 
 Clerodendrum tomentellum 
 Clerodendrum tomentosum 
 Clerodendrum tonkinense 
 Clerodendrum toxicarium 
 Clerodendrum tracyanum 
 Clerodendrum trichanthum 
 Clerodendrum tricholobum 
 Clerodendrum trichotomum 
 Clerodendrum triflorum 
 Clerodendrum tubulosum 
 Clerodendrum umbellatum 
 Clerodendrum umbratile 
 Clerodendrum urticifolium 
 Clerodendrum villosicalyx 
 Clerodendrum villosum 
 Clerodendrum vinosum 
 Clerodendrum volubile 
 Clerodendrum wallii 
 Clerodendrum welwitschii 
 Clerodendrum williamsii 
 Clerodendrum yunnanense

Formerly placed here

Pseudocaryopteris foetida (D.Don) P.D.Cantino (as C. foetidum D.Don)
Rotheca incisa (Klotzsch) Steane & Mabb. (as C. incisum Klotzsch or C. macrosiphon Hook.f.)
Rotheca myricoides (Hochst.) Steane & Mabb. (as C. myricoides (Hochst.) Vatke or C. ugandense Prain)
Rotheca serrata (L.) Steane & Mabb. (as C. serratum (L.) Moon)
Volkameria aculeata L. (as C. aculeatum (L.) Schltdl.)
Volkameria glabra (E.Mey.) Mabb. & Y.W.Yuan (as C. glabrum E.Mey.)
Volkameria inermis L. (as C. inerme (L.) Gaertn.)
Volkameria ligustrina Jacq. (as C. ligustrinum (Jacq.) R.Br.)

Gallery

References

External links 

 Clerodendrum At:Index Nominum Genericorum At: References At: NMNH Department of Botany
 Clerodendrum In: volume 2 Of: Species Plantarum At: Biodiversity Heritage Library
 Flora of China: Clerodendrum

 
Taxa named by Carl Linnaeus
Lamiaceae genera